What's flumpool!? is the first full album by Japanese rock band Flumpool, released on December 23, 2009. Its cover is similar to Unreal's in that it features the band members nude, though this time as statuettes. It is one of the longest recordings on a CD in history, with 79 minutes and 58 seconds, 2 seconds under the maximum a CD can contain.

Track listing

Charts

References

2009 albums
Flumpool albums
A-Sketch albums